Arthur Capell (1902–1986) was an Australian linguist.

Arthur Capell may also refer to:

Arthur Capell, 1st Earl of Essex (1631–1683), English statesman
Arthur Capell, 1st Baron Capell of Hadham (1608–1649), English politician
Arthur Capell, 6th Earl of Essex (1803–1892)
Arthur John Capel (1894–1979), British Royal Air Force officer

See also
Arthur Capel (1881–1919), polo player and lover of Coco Chanel